In taxonomy, Palaeococcus is a genus of the Thermococcaceae.

Phylogeny

References

Further reading

External links

Archaea genera